40 Leonis Minoris (40 LMi) is a white hued star located in the northern constellation Leo Minor. It is rarely called 14 H. Leonis Minoris, which is the designation given by Polis astronomer Johann Hevelius. 

It has an apparent magnitude of 5.51, making it faintly visible to the naked eye. At 40 LMi's current distance, its brightness is diminished by only 0.02 magnitudes due to interstellar dust.

40 LMi is a chemically pecuilar  A-type main-sequence star with a stellar classification of A4 Vn. This indicates that it is an A4 dwarf with nebulous absorption lines due to rapid rotation. It has 1.69 times the mass of the Sun and 1.54 times its girth.

This star was part of a 2005 survey regarding proper motions from the Hipparcos satellite. Its proper motion varied, indicating that an unseen companion may cause it. This led to Peter P. Eggleton and Andrei Tokovinin classifying it as an astrometric binary. There also 3 optical companions located near 40 LMi. Their relative positions and brightness are listed below.

References

A-type main-sequence stars
Am stars
Astrometric binaries
Leo Minor
Leonis Minoris, 40
BD+27 01927
092769
052422
4189
High-proper-motion stars